Zimbabwe has 13 buildings that stand taller than 70 metres (230 ft). The tallest building in Zimbabwe would not have been the RBZ (28 storey, 120m tall), not even any building in Harare. If it had been built, the tallest building in Zimbabwe would have been the ABC Building (33 storey, 141m tall) in Zvishavane, designed in 1976 by John Graham Architects.

Harare, Zimbabwe's capital city, is where most of the country's tallest buildings are concentrated.

There are currently no major high-rise developments under construction or proposed in the country.

Buildings
This includes spires and architectural details but does not include antenna masts.

See also
 List of tallest buildings in Africa
 List of tallest buildings in South Africa

References

Tallest
Zimbabwe
Zimbabwe